Me Shivaji Park is a 2018 Indian Marathi-language film directed by Mahesh Manjrekar. Produced by Mahesh Manjrekar Movies and Gauri Pictures. The film stars Ashok Saraf, Vikram Gokhale, Shivaji Satam, Dilip Prabhavalkar and Satish Alekar in lead roles. It was theatrically released on 18 October 2018.

Cast 

 Ashok Saraf as Digambar Sawant 
 Shivaji Satam as Rustum Mistry 
 Dilip Prabhavalkar as Professor Dilip Pradhan
 Satish Alekar as Satish Joshi
 Vikram Gokhale as Judge Vikram Rajadhyakshya 
 Bharti Achrekar as Binny Rustum Mistry 
 Manjari Fadnis as Aishwarya Nair
 Sharad Ponkshe as Harshad Vedant
 Suhas Joshi as Mrs. Vikram Rajadhyaksha
 Santosh Juvekar as Harish Vedant
 Uday Tikekar as Balwa Seth
 Savita Malpekar as Savita Joshi 

 Dipti Lele as Reporter 
 Shushant Shelar
 Abhijeet Satam
 Madhura Velankar as Meena Gawli
 Pravin Tarde as Young Sawant

Release

Theatrical 
Me Shivaji Park was released on 18 October 2018 in theaters.

Home media  
The film was originally available on ZEE5 and Mx Player.

Reception

Critical reception 
Kalpeshraj Kubal of Maharashtra Times gave 3 out of 5 and wrote "first half of the movie seems a little choppy and more dramatic, it keeps the audience glued to their seats. The movie is looks like One time watch." Prajakta Chitnis of Lokmat also rated 3 out of 5 and she too would write that the film holds the audience well till the interval, but after the interval the film becomes too much of a stretch. However, she said that the film is worth watching once. Keyur Seta of Cinestaan gave 4 stars and praised performances of actors. Mayuri Phadnis of The Times of India gave 3 out of 5 and praised performances and incredible story and screenplay.

References

External links 
  
 Me Shivaji Park at Rotten Tomatoes

2010s Marathi-language films
2018 films
Indian crime drama films